Idols 1 was the first season of the Dutch version of Idols hosted by Reinout Oerlemans & Tooske Ragas. The winner was Jamai Loman with Jim Bakkum as runner-up.

Summaries

Contestants
(ages stated are at time of contest)
(in order of elimination)
Roger Peterson, 22 (withdrew)
Zosja El Rhazi, 21
Yuli Minguel, 23
Joël de Tombe, 21
Bas Nibbelke, 20
Marieke van Ginneken, 23
David Goncalves, 22
Dewi Pechler, 19
Hind Laroussi, 17
Jim Bakkum, 15 (runner-up)
Jamai Loman, 16 (winner)

Liveshow Themes
Liveshow 1 (January 11, 2003): Number 1 Hits
Liveshow 2 (January 18, 2003): Soundtracks
Liveshow 3 (January 25, 2003): Top 40 Hits
Liveshow 4 (February 1, 2003): Dutch Hits
Liveshow 5 (February 8, 2003): Swinging 80's
Liveshow 6 (February 15, 2003): Love Songs
Liveshow 7 (February 22, 2003): People's Choice
Liveshow 8 (March 1, 2003): Contestant's Choice
Final Liveshow (March 8, 2003)

Judges
Henkjan Smits
Eric van Tijn
Jerney Kaagman
Edwin Jansen

Finals

Live show details

Heat 1 (21 December 2002)

Heat 2 (28 December 2002)

Heat 3 (4 January 2003)

Live Show 1 (11 January 2003)
Theme: Number 1 Hits

Live Show 2 (18 January 2003)
Theme: Soundtracks

Live Show 3 (25 January 2003)
Theme: Top 40 Hits

Live Show 4 (1 February 2003)
Theme: Dutch Hits

Live Show 5 (8 February 2003)
Theme: Swinging 80's

Live Show 6 (15 February 2003)
Theme: Love Songs

Live Show 7 (22 February 2003)
Theme: People's Choice

Live Show 8: Semi-final (1 March 2003)
Theme: Contestant's Choice

Live final (8 March 2003)

Season 01
2003 Dutch television seasons